Ava Leavell Haymon was the 2013–2015 Poet Laureate of Louisiana.

Career
She is the author of four collections of poetry, including Eldest Daughter, Why the House Is Made of Gingerbread, Kitchen Heat and The Strict Economy of Fire, along with five chapbooks.

She is the editor of the forthcoming Louisiana State University Press, Barataria Poetry Series (Spring 2014) and has been awarded the Louisiana Literature Prize for poetry in 2003,   the L.E. Phillabaum Poetry Award for 2010, the Mississippi Institute of Arts and Letters 2011 Award in Poetry  and has taught as an Artist in the Schools for a number of years.

Her third book, Why The House Was Made Of Gingerbread, was chosen as one of the top ten books of 2010 by Women's Voices for Change.

Ava's work has appeared in Northwest Review,  Prairie Schooner,  Poetry,  and others.

Selected works

Books

Chapbooks
Why the Groundhog Fears Her Shadow. Greensboro, North Carolina: March Street Press, 1996.  
Built in Fear of Heat. Troy, Maine:  Nightshade Press, 1994.  
Staving Off Rapture. Chico, California:  Flume Press, 1994.  
A Name Gift for Every Child. Baton Rouge: Mother Daybreak Press, 1991.

References

External links
Official website
"Ava Leavell Haymon", Poets & Writers

Living people
Year of birth missing (living people)
American women poets
Poets from Louisiana
Poets Laureate of Louisiana
21st-century American women